A. C. Vilwanathan is an Indian politician and is Member of the Legislative Assembly of Tamil Nadu. He was elected to the Tamil Nadu legislative assembly as a Dravida Munnetra Kazhagam candidate from Ambur constituency in the by-election in 2019 & 2021.

Electoral performance

References 

1947 births
Living people
Dravida Munnetra Kazhagam politicians
People from Vellore
Tamil Nadu MLAs 2021–2026